The Thirty Names of Night is a novel by Zeyn Joukhadar, published November 24, 2020 by Atria Books. The book received the Stonewall Book Award for Literature and the Lambda Literary Award for Transgender Fiction.

Reception 
The Thirty Names of Night received starred reviews from Library Journal, Booklist, and Kirkus Reviews, as well as positive reviews from The New York Times Book Review, ZYZZYVA, and Publishers Weekly. USA Today provided a mixed review.

References 

2020 American novels
Atria Publishing Group books
Novels with transgender themes
Stonewall Book Award-winning works
Lambda Literary Award-winning works
Novels set in New York City
2020s LGBT novels